Elena Likhovtseva and Daniel Nestor won the mixed doubles title at the 2007 Australian Open tennis tournament, defeating Victoria Azarenka and Max Mirnyi in the final 6–4, 6–4.

Martina Hingis and Mahesh Bhupathi were the defending champions, but Hingis did not participate in the mixed doubles tournament. Bhupathi partnered Daniela Hantuchová, but lost in the first round to Jelena Janković and Nenad Zimonjić.

Seeds

  Lisa Raymond /  Bob Bryan (quarterfinals)
  Rennae Stubbs /  Mark Knowles (second round)
  Samantha Stosur /  Leander Paes (quarterfinals)
  Francesca Schiavone /  Jonas Björkman (semifinals)
  Yan Zi /  Todd Perry (second round)
  Cara Black /  Marcin Matkowski (first round)
  Liezel Huber /  Kevin Ullyett (semifinals)
  Meghann Shaughnessy /  Martin Damm (first round)

Draw

Finals

Top half

Bottom half

External links
Draw
 2007 Australian Open – Doubles draws and results at the International Tennis Federation

Mixed Doubles
Australian Open (tennis) by year – Mixed doubles